In German dialectology, the Speyer line or Main line (Main River) is an isogloss separating the Central German dialects to the north, which have a stop in words like Appel "apple", from the Upper German dialects to the south, which have an affricate: Apfel. The line begins in Alsace near Strasbourg, and runs north-east to Thüringen, crossing the Rhine at Speyer. After passing close to Erfurt, it turns south-east and continues into the formerly German-speaking parts of Bohemia. The line is exemplified by place-names containing an uncombined /p/ phoneme, which lie north of the line (Paderborn, Potsdam, Wuppertal), while those with an affricate /pf/ (Pfaffenhofen, Pforzheim) lie mostly to the south.

See also
 Benrath line
 Uerdingen line
 High German consonant shift

References

Isoglosses
German language